An ashtray is a receptacle for ash from cigarettes, cigars, and other smokable products.  Ashtrays are typically made of fire-retardant material such as glass, heat-resistant plastic, pottery, metal, or stone. It differs from a cigarette receptacle, which is used specifically for discarding cigarettes after being smoked.

Types

The most common ashtray design is a shallow cylinder with a flat base, to rest on a table. Other ashtrays, particularly in public places, are wall-mounted, and larger than standard tabletop ashtrays due to the increased use they receive. There are also public ashtrays combined with trashcans. Many ashtrays have notches at the rim, to hold cigarettes and/or a cigar. Frequently ashtrays were equipped in older large or luxury cars before later being available as dealer-installed accessory items. For example, cars such as the BMW E38 featured ashtrays and lighters installed in both rear doors.

There are ashtrays that have a cover to prevent odor from leaving the ashtray. It also prevents oxygen from flowing in, so a cigarette will go out by itself, even if it has not been completely extinguished by pushing into the surface.

History

While simple, primitive forms of ashtrays existed long before the 19th century, it was during the start of the 20th century that the design, aesthetics and their popularity really took off. As more women began to smoke in the early 1900s, the ashtray went closer to an art form. Many women avoided the use of the traditional ashtray as it failed to reflect their feminine values through an activity that was long declared as being exclusive to men. What emerged were detailed, often very fancy ashtrays. These ashtrays depicted pastoral scenes of maidens wandering through vibrantly colored landscapes. Some even featured very luxurious cast-iron models of women in fancy dresses, animals in states of play and the occasional porcelain or ceramic tray highlighting extravagant floral arrangements.

The word "ashtray" in unhyphenated form, rather than "ash tray" or "ash-tray", did not come into common use until 1926.

As time went on, and the onset of women smoking both cigars and cigarettes became less of a departure from the average person, ashtrays saw a decline in design aesthetics and began more of a shift towards practicality. However, it was not uncommon to see ashtrays featuring pin-up girls in bars during this decade. It was also during this time that another trend in ashtrays began to emerge, which was the auto-ashtray.

While the addition of vehicle ashtrays is now becoming something of the past, there was a time when these not only came standard, they were expected. In the early years, design oversights put these ash receptacles right below the A/C and heating so every time the owner would use either of these, the ash would inadvertently fly in their face or even all throughout the car.  But as new models of vehicles were constantly introduced to the public, these little foibles gave way and many began to use chrome trays with covers that could be opened and closed at the driver's discretion.  Many luxury cars would make it a more luxurious design and it was common to see intricately made ashtrays in some of the high-end cars of the day. These ashtrays would feature leather, high-end metals and even specialized engravings by the manufacturer.

But, just like the stand-alone ashtray, the vehicle ashtray began to lose popularity and in 1994, vehicles began to be produced without them and instead, offer the buyer the option to include one from the dealer.

Today, ashtrays are still used for cigarette smokers, but they have also been making a small revival in popularity from the cigar aficionados of the world. Ashtrays designed for cigars are often larger than standard ashtrays and include notches big enough to hold the cigar.

Ashtrays as design objects 
A number of well-known designers have created ashtrays:

See also
Smoking
Smoking culture

References

External links

Domestic implements
Waste containers
Smoking
Tobacciana